Brownside is an American hip-hop group founded in 1993 by Eazy-E. The group originally consisted of Toker (Gilbert Izquierdo), Fello (Tokers brother) but he died before being involved with recording, Wicked (Pierre Lamas),and Danger (Carlos Martinez), who was killed in a drive-by shooting in 1996. With Trouble (Jose Phillip Aguirre) and Klever (Alex Izquierdo) Tokers baby brother joining later on. Originally, Eazy-E had signed Brownside to Ruthless Records to create a Chicano rap version of the rap group N.W.A. Toker was murdered in Rosarito, Baja California in 2018. Following Toker’s murder, Brownside’s status is currently unknown.

History
Their debut album, Eastside Drama, released early 1997. In 1999, they released Payback which contains unreleased tracks and some remixes of their tracks from Eastside Drama. In 2006, they released The Takeover which introduced a new member to Brownside, Trouble, whom Toker met while incarcerated. On May 27, 2016 Brownside released Bangin' Story'z, with the introduction of a new Brownside member, Klever (Toker’s young brother).

Discography
 Brownside (1993)
 Eastside Drama (1997)
 Payback (1999)
 The Take Over (2006)
 Trece Razones (13 Reasons) (2008)
 Bangin Story'z (2016)

References

Chicano rap
Gangsta rap groups
Mexican-American culture in Los Angeles
Musical groups from Los Angeles
Musical groups established in 1993